The 1958–59 season was the third season of the Liga Española de Baloncesto. Barcelona won their title.

Teams

Venues and locations

League table

Relegation playoffs

|}

Individual statistics

Points

External links

ACB.com 
linguasport 

Liga Española de Baloncesto (1957–1983) seasons
1958–59 in Spanish basketball